Brading is a surname. Notable people with the surname include:

Alison Brading (1939–2011), British scientist
Charles Brading (1935–2016), American pharmacist and politician
David Brading (born 1936), English historian, academic and writer
Ralph Brading (born 1934), Australian politician
Reginald Brading (1899–1926), English World War I flying ace

See also
Sanna Bråding (born 1980), Swedish actress

Robert Lee Brading (Born1964),Bloomington Illinois USA